Pandion  may refer to:

In Greek mythology

 Pandion (mythology) for mythological characters named Pandion.
Pandion I, a legendary king of Athens, father of the sisters Procne and Philomela.
Pandion II, a legendary king of Athens, father of the brothers Aegeus, Pallas, Nisos and Lycus.
Pandion (hero), the eponymous hero of the Attic tribe Pandionis, usually assumed to be one of the legendary Athenian kings Pandion I or Pandion II.
 Pandion son of Phineus in Greek mythology
 Pandion, a son of Aegyptus, husband and victim of Callidice, daughter of Danaus

Other uses
 King Pandion, a member of the Pandya Dynasty (c. 50 BC – 50 CE)
 Pandion (bird), a genus of birds of prey with a single member, the osprey (Pandion haliaetus), or, depending on the authority, two species
Western osprey, Pandion haliaetus
Eastern osprey, Pandion cristatus
 Pandion, the highest status level in the EuroBonus frequent flyer program
 Alfa Romeo Pandion, a concept car by Bertone shown at the 2010 Geneva Motor Show